Anthony Peter Bevilacqua (born July 23, 1976) is an American musician. He is currently guitarist with The Distillers. He also used the stage name "Tony Bradley" while with The Distillers.

References

External links
Spinnerette official site
Spinnerette MySpace
The Distillers official site
MTV.com, News 
Spin.com, News
NME.com, News
Observer.co.uk

Interview with Crusher Magazine
Interview with Cord Magazine

American rock guitarists
American male guitarists
1976 births
Living people
Spinnerette members
The Distillers members
21st-century American guitarists
21st-century American male musicians
American people of Italian descent